Aron Forbes (born January 17, 1985) is an American guitarist, producer, and songwriter, known for his collaborations with Halsey, Banks, Billie Eilish, Donna Missal, One Direction, Olivia Rodrigo, Vérité, alongside others.

Early life and education
Born and raised in Big Sur, California, United States, Forbes began playing guitar at age five. At age 11 he was singing and playing in a blues band he had founded in 1998, The Blue Tones. The band was invited to play at the Apollo Theater on 9 November 2000 and named by Teen People Magazine one of the nation's top three new teen bands.

He graduated from Carmel High School in 2003 and in the same year moved to Los Angeles to attend the USC Thornton School of Music.

Career

2009–2013: The X Factor, One Direction, and other collaborations
In 2009, Forbes was asked to music direct and play guitar for Justin Timberlake's Tennman Records artist Esmée Denters. For two years he toured the world opening and playing alongside acts such as Lady Gaga, the Black Eyed Peas and Ne-Yo.

Beginning in 2011, Forbes began playing as the guitarist for The X Factor's US and UK series. That gig led to playing guitar for One Direction on their first US tour and allowed him to begin his journey into the studio to pursue writing and production.

2014–2019: Collaborations with Halsey, BANKS, Billie Eilish, and others
Forbes's career as writer and producer began to emerge in 2014. That year, ASCAP named the Mr Little Jeans track "Dear Santa," which Forbes co-wrote, one of its best original holiday songs of the year. In 2015 he was asked by long-time mentor and collaborator Tim Anderson to add production to Halsey's "Drive" from her debut studio album Drive. He also wrote and played guitar on BANKS' song "Someone New" for her debut studio album Goddess.

In 2017 he co-wrote Billie Eilish's RIAA Gold record "Bored," and it was included in the first season and soundtrack of 13 Reasons Why.

In 2015-2016, Forbes worked closely alongside BANKS to create her second studio album The Altar, penning two songs and producing throughout. In 2018, he continued his musical journey with BANKS, writing four songs for her 2019 album III.

In 2016 he worked with VÉRITÉ, Nawas, and FYOHNA, for whom he produced another track in 2019.

Meanwhile, in 2018 he worked as writer and producer with Donna Missal, Mr Little Jeans, COIN, and The Born Love, his own duo with Kevin Daniel, whose single "Badlands" reached the Top 15 on Spotify's Top 50 US Viral Chart, and the Top 10 on Hype Machine.

In 2019 he wrote and produced four more tracks for Mr Little Jeans. Additional credits for the year included writing and producing tracks for Hey Violet's album Crawl and working again with FYOHNA.

Music direction
Staying connected with the stage, Forbes often music directs for artists he collaborates with in the studio. Starting in 2015 Forbes would music direct German alt band Tokio Hotel for their comeback world tour of Feel It All. From 2016 through the present day he has worked with BANKS on her The Altar and III tours. He has music directed for friends Billie Eilish (from the beginning of her career) and FINNEAS. In 2019, Forbes added to his MD roster Harry Hudson, Cyn and Conan Gray.

In 2020 Forbes music directed Olivia Rodrigo's debut performance of "drivers license" on The Tonight Show Starring Jimmy Fallon and Saturday Night Live. Additionally he worked on her Brit Awards performance and her Sour Prom concert film release which he music directed and mixed.

In 2021 he was nominated for two Primetime Emmy Awards, for Music Direction and Sound Mixing, for his work on the Billie Eilish documentary Billie Eilish: The World's a Little Blurry.

Discography

References

1985 births
Living people
Guitarists from California
Record producers from California